Viking FK Kvinner is the women's team of Norwegian football club Viking FK. Based in Stavanger, it plays in the Norwegian Second Division, the third tier of women's football in Norway. Founded in 2011, the team first entered the league system ahead of the 2015 season. The current head coach is Helge Aune.

History
The team was founded in 2011. In 2015, it entered the league system, participating in the 3. divisjon, the fourth tier of Norwegian women's football. In the 2016 season, the team cooperated with neighbouring Hinna, whose first team was in the 2. divisjon at the time. The cooperation lasted only for one season, before Viking restarted their operations. The 2017 season resulted in a second place finish in the 3. divisjon, two points behind Staal Jørpeland. In 2018, Viking finished first in their group and subsequently earned promotion to the 2. divisjon. The following season, the team again won their group, which qualified them for the promotion play-offs to the 1. divisjon along with the other group winners. Viking were eliminated in the play-offs, and were therefore not promoted. The 2020 season was cancelled due to the COVID-19 pandemic in Norway. In October 2020, Viking FK issued a statement to further focus on the women's team, in hope of reaching the Toppserien, the top division, as soon as possible. This, in more concrete terms, meant that the team would be strengthened, gradually professionalized and that home matches would be played at Viking Stadion. In May 2021, negotiations between Viking and Toppserien club Avaldsnes were made public. The two clubs had been discussing a cooperation, which could have seen Viking take over Avaldsnes' spot in the Toppserien. The negotiations fell through in August 2021 due to financial issues. Viking finished the 2021 season in first place, which again qualified them for the promotion play-offs. In the final game of the play-offs, Viking won 2–1 against Odd, one goal short of promotion.

List of seasons

Current squad

Technical staff

References

External links
 Official website 
 Profile at the Norwegian Football Federation 
 Profile at NIFS.no 

Women
Association football clubs established in 2011
2011 establishments in Norway
Women's football clubs in Norway
Sport in Stavanger